Bon Keshkeh (also Romanized as Bon Keshgeh) is a village in Mamulan Rural District, Mamulan District, Pol-e Dokhtar County, Lorestan Province, Iran. At the 2006 census, its population was 206, in 46 families.

References 

Towns and villages in Pol-e Dokhtar County